William Patrick Ryan (1867–1942), was an Irish author and journalist.

He was born near Templemore, County Tipperary. The early part of his career was spent in London, where he worked as a journalist. Upon returning to Ireland he began his own newspapers, titled Peasant and Irish Nation. He was condemned by Cardinal Michael Logue for his radical Socialist views and returned to London in 1910.
Ryan's son Desmond Ryan was the biographer of PH Pearse and Michael Collins and the memorialist of the Easter Rising, in which he fought.

References

External links
 

1867 births
1942 deaths
People from County Tipperary
Irish journalists
Irish newspaper founders
Irish poets
Irish novelists
Irish socialists
Irish male novelists
Irish male poets